Known Fact (17 March 1977 – 12 July 2000) was a Kentucky-bred British-trained racehorse and sire. He was the leading British miler of 1980, being awarded the 2000 Guineas on the disqualification of Nureyev and defeating Kris to win the Queen Elizabeth II Stakes.

Background
Known Fact was by sire of sires In Reality and out of a Tim Tam mare named Tamerett who also produced Secrettame the dam of the champion sire Gone West. Known Fact also has a half-brother, Tentam, who won many notable US stakes like the United Nations Stakes and the Metropolitan Handicap.

Race career
Known Fact excelled on English turf despite being out of American dirt horses. He started his two-year-old season with a second place in the Mill Reef Stakes and a win in the William Hill Middle Park Stakes. He then moved into his three-year-old year with strong wins the Queen Elizabeth II Stakes and the Two Thousand Guineas Stakes along with several other notable stakes. Known Fact was voted Champion Miler in England at the end of his third year and he was retired to stand at Juddmonte Farms in Kentucky.

Stud career
Known Fact was the first stallion to stand at Prince Khalid Abdullah's North American division of Juddmonte Farms. Known Fact sired around 25 stakes winners and his last standing fee was US$10,000 before he died in 2000 at the age of 23 after covering only 20 mares.

Sire of:
 Markofdistinction - European Champion Older Miler, Sire in Japan
 Warning - Winner of Gr. 1 Sussex Stakes and Gr. 1 Queen Elizabeth II Stakes
 Bold Fact - Winner of Gr. 1 Nunthorpe Stakes
 So Factual - Winner of Gr. 1 Nunthorpe Stakes
 Proud Fact – Winner of Prix Ceres

Damsire of:
 Banshee Breeze – US Champion Three Year Old Filly 
 Overarching – South African Horse of the Season (2005) 
 Naughty New Yorker – Winner of Gr. 2 Red Smith Handicap
 High Limit – Winner of Gr.2 Louisiana Derby 
 Brilliant – Winner of Gr.2 Jefferson Cup

References

1977 racehorse births
2000 racehorse deaths
Racehorses bred in Florida
Racehorses trained in the United Kingdom
Thoroughbred family 2-f
Godolphin Arabian sire line
2000 Guineas winners